The 2019 Nobel Prize in Literature was awarded to the Austrian writer Peter Handke (born 1942) "for an influential work that with linguistic ingenuity has explored the periphery and the specificity of human experience." The prize was announced by the Swedish Academy on 10 October 2019. Handke is the second Austrian Nobel laureate in Literature after Elfriede Jelinek, who won the prize in 2004.

Laureate

Peter Handke is one of the most influential writers in Europe after the Second World War. His bibliography contains novels, essays, note books, dramatic works and screenplays. Already in the 1960s, Handke set his mark on the literary scene. He distanced himself from prevailing demands on community-oriented and political positions. His works are filled with a strong desire to discover and to bring his discoveries to life by finding new literary expressions for them. One of his books is Wunschloses Unglück ("A Sorrow Beyond Dreams", 1972), written after his mother's suicide. Among his important works are Publikumsbeschimpfung ("Offending the Audience", 1966), Die Angst des Tormanns beim Elfmeter ("The Goalie's Anxiety at the Penalty Kick, 1970), Die linkshändige Frau ("The Left-Handed Woman", 1976), and Die morawische Nacht ("The Moravian Nights", 2008).

Reactions

Personal reactions
Interviewed by Adam Smith, Chief Scientific Officer of Nobel Media, Handke described a sense of inexplicable freedom on hearing the news, the fact that he felt the need for another metamorphosis and discusses ways in which his writing brought him the most fulfilment. Asked what drives him to write productively and explore many genres, he responded saying:

International reactions

The decision of the Nobel Committee to award Handke a Nobel Prize in literature in 2019 was denounced internationally by a variety of public and academic intellectuals, writers and journalists. Criticism focuses on the writer's view on the breakup of Yugoslavia and Yugoslav Wars, which has been described as pro-Serbian, his support of the late Slobodan Milošević, and Bosnian genocide denial. The high-profile figures who decried the decision of the Swedish Academy include individuals such as Deborah Lipstadt, Holocaust historian, who in her letter published in The New York Times wrote that the Nobel committee has awarded Handke a platform which "he does not deserve and the public does not need him to have", adding that such platform could convince some that his "false claims must have some legitimacy"; Jonathan Littell, who said "he might be a fantastic artist, but as a human being he is my enemy – he’s an asshole"; Miha Mazzini, who said that "some artists sold their human souls for ideologies (Hamsun and Nazism), some for hate (Céline and his rabid antisemitism), some for money and power (Kusturica) but the one that offended me the most was Handke with his naivety for the Milošević regime. ... I found him cruel and totally self-absorbed in his naivety"; Hari Kunzru, who said that Handke is "a troubling choice for a Nobel committee" and that he is "a fine writer, who combines great insight with shocking ethical blindness"; Salman Rushdie, who also criticized Handke's support for wartime Serbia in 1999; and Slavoj Žižek, Aleksandar Hemon, Bora Ćosić, and others.

The award was met with negative criticism in Kosovo, Bosnia and Herzegovina, Albania, Croatia, and Turkey, resulting in public statements of disapproval. Expressing "deep regret", the decision was condemned by PEN America, PEN England and Wales, PEN Norway, PEN Bosnia and Herzegovina, PEN Croatia. A group of demonstrators protested against the writer when he arrived to receive the prize. Mothers of Srebrenica protested against the award with messages to oppose the "spreading lies", while Women – Victims of War association from Republika Srpska organized a rally in Stockholm in support of Handke, saying that they support all people "who speak accurately and correctly and who think with their head".

PEN International issued the following statement from its President Jennifer Clement in response to the awarding of the 2019 Nobel Prize in Literature: 

Support for Handke came from Jon Fosse, former recipient of the Ibsen Award, who welcomed the decision of the Swedish Academy to award Handke the Nobel Prize, saying that he was a worthy recipient and deserved it. The Nobel laureate Elfriede Jelinek said: "The great poet Handke has earned the Nobel prize 10 times." Norwegian novelist Karl Ove Knausgård reacted to the Nobel Prize for Handke: "I can’t think of a more obvious Nobel laureate than him." He added that the Austrian had written masterpieces in every decade of his career. Olga Tokarczuk, who was awarded the Nobel Prize for 2018 at the same ceremony, said she was proud to be with Handke, whom she greatly values, and tо the fact that both awards go to Central Europe. Award-winning filmmakers Wim Wenders and Emir Kusturica publicly congratulated Handke and traveled to Stockholm for the award ceremony to support him. Austrian president Alexander Van der Bellen called Handke's voice "unfussy and unique … We have a lot to thank Peter Handke for. I hope he knows that."

Both the Swedish academy and Nobel Committee for Literature members defended their decision to award Handke the Nobel prize. Academy members Mats Malm and Eric M. Runesson wrote in the Swedish paper Dagens Nyheter that Handke had "definitely made provocative, inappropriate and unclear statements on political issues" but that they had "found nothing in what he has written that involves attacks on civil society or respect for the equal value of all people". The Swedish Academy quoted an article published in Libération and the Süddeutsche Zeitung in 2006, in which Handke said that "the Srebrenica massacre was the worst crime against humanity in Europe since World War II". Additionally, Handke stated the following in 2019 through the publishing house Suhrkamp Verlag: "In 2006 I wrote: 'Srebrenica massacre was the worst crime against humanity in Europe since World War II'. I would like to add: of course the genocide has caused infinite suffering, which I have never denied. A suffering that cannot be extinguished by anything. I regret my remarks, should they have conveyed something else." Nobel Committee's external member Henrik Petersen described Handke as "radically unpolitical" in his writings and that this support for Serbs had been misunderstood, while Rebecka Kärde said: "When we give the award to Handke, we argue that the task of literature is other than to confirm and reproduce what society’s central view believes is morally right" adding that the author "absolutely deserves a Nobel Prize."

The Intercept published a number of articles by Peter Maass criticizing Peter Handke's Nobel Prize in Literature reception because of his attitudes towards the Srebrenica massacre committed by the Bosnian Serbs. In another article by Intercept, Maass went to great length to call Handke an "exponent of white nationalism". Subsequently, in an interview conducted by Maass in December 2019, asking Handke whether the 1995 Srebrenica massacre (8,000 unarmed Muslim men and boys were killed by the Bosnian Serb Army of Republika Srpska) had happened, Handke responded: "I prefer toilet paper, an anonymous letter with toilet paper inside, to your empty and ignorant questions." Maass also claims that two Nobel prize jurors were adhering to conspiracy theories with regard to American involvement in the Balkan conflict and that they were "misinformed" about Handke's literary achievements. Germany's Eugen Ruge also protested against the scale of the criticism. In November 2019, around 120 authors, literary scholars, translators, and artists expressed their unease in an open letter. They felt that the criticism against Handke was no longer rational. The letter stated that the criticism of Handke "consists almost entirely of hatred, resentment, insinuations, distortions and the like. It has degenerated into anti-Handke propaganda."

On December 10, 2019, Christina Doctare participated in a demonstration at Norrmalmstorg in Stockholm wherein she returned her Nobel Peace Prize medal from 1988, which she was awarded jointly in her capacity as a member of the United Nations peacekeeping forces. "The academy has shown arrogance, ignorance and a lack of knowledge by giving Handke the award," she said. "Literature can never be above war crimes. Those who say so have blood on their hands."

Award ceremony

Prize presentation
The presentation speech delivered by Prof. Anders Olsson, Nobel Committee Chairman, on December 10, 2019, described Handke's style of writing, saying:

Banquet speech
At the Nobel Banquet held at the Blue Hall, Stockholm City Hall's main hall, Handke delivered the following short speech:

Other Nobel-related events

Banville's "Prank Call"
A man impersonating Malm rang the novelist John Banville on the day that the Swedish Academy intended to announce the recipients of the 2019 and 2018 Nobel Prizes in Literature. The man purporting to be Malm told Banville he had won and even read out the customary citation and asked if he would prefer to be designated the 2018 or 2019 laureate. Banville was attending a physiotherapy appointment at the time and was lying face down on a couch when the call came. He informed his daughter; she called her father back while watching the live announcement at midday to tell him his name had not been mentioned. After the announcement, a voicemail to Banville (again from the man posing as Malm) claimed the Swedish Academy had withdrawn his prize due a disagreement. Banville felt sorry for the man purporting to be Malm: "He certainly sounded upset, he was a very good actor". But he later compared the voice of the speaker to that of the real Malm, at which point he realised that neither man sounded alike. However, despite this, when Banville rang the number back he found himself in contact with the offices of the Swedish Academy.

Nobel Committee
The Swedish Academy's Nobel Committee for the 2019 and 2020 Nobel Prize in Literature were the following members:

Notes

References

External links
Price Announcement nobelprize.org
Award Ceremony Speech nobelprize.org

2019
Peter Handke
2019 awards